Reed Nunataks is a cluster of nunataks that form a divide between the upper portions of the Reeves and Larsen Glaciers, six nautical miles (11 km) west of Hansen Nunatak, in Victoria Land. Mapped by United States Geological Survey (USGS) from surveys and U.S. Navy aerial photographs, 1956–62. Named by Advisory Committee on Antarctic Names (US-ACAN) for David E. Reed, USGS Topographic Engineer at McMurdo Station, 1964–65.
 

Nunataks of Victoria Land
Scott Coast